Sadia Yousuf (born 4 November 1989) is a Pakistani former cricketer who played as a slow left-arm orthodox bowler. She appeared in 58 One Day Internationals and 51 Twenty20 Internationals for Pakistan between 2008 and 2017. She played domestic cricket for Faisalabad, Zarai Taraqiati Bank Limited, Omar Associates and State Bank of Pakistan.

International career
She made her One Day International debut against Ireland on 8 February 2008.

She made her Twenty20 International debut for Pakistan Women against New Zealand Women on 10 May 2010.

References

External links
 
 

1989 births
Living people
Pakistani women cricketers
Pakistan women One Day International cricketers
Pakistan women Twenty20 International cricketers
Faisalabad women cricketers
Zarai Taraqiati Bank Limited women cricketers
Omar Associates women cricketers
State Bank of Pakistan women cricketers
Asian Games medalists in cricket
Cricketers at the 2014 Asian Games
Asian Games gold medalists for Pakistan
Medalists at the 2014 Asian Games